Jansen Newman Institute is an Australian private college that offers both tertiary education and vocational education and training in counselling, psychotherapy and community services.

The college is a part of Torrens University since 2008 that is owned by Strategic Education, Inc.

History
Jansen Newman Institute was established in 1978 by David Jansen and was originally named the "Relationship Development Centre". In 1981, psychologist Margaret Newman joined David Jansen and the name was changed to the Jansen Newman Institute. In 1994, the Institute became one of Sydney's first private higher education providers, with the accreditation of a diploma and graduate diploma. The accreditation of the Bachelor of Counselling and Human Change (BCHC) course came for the college in 2000 with the Graduate Diploma in Counselling and Psychotherapy (GDCP) course following in 2001.

In August 2006, the Institute became an approved Higher Education Provider (HEP) under the government's Higher Education Support Act 2003. Approval as a Higher Education Provider enabled eligible students to receive FEE-HELP, a government loan to assist students with payment of their tuition fees.

In 2008, the institute was purchased by what was then known as the Think: Education Group (now Think Education). This   led to further growth in the college and in 2008 the Institute launched the Bachelor of Applied Social Science (BASS) course offering courses both on campus at St Leonards and also online with specialisation streams in counselling, community services and human resource management. In 2011, the Institute launched its Masters in Counselling and Applied Psychotherapy program.

In 2013, Jansen Newman Institute moved to Pyrmont, Sydney.

Campuses
The college operates from a campus in Pyrmont, which is shared with other Think Education colleges the Australasian College of Natural Therapies and the Australian National College of Beauty. The college is scheduled to extend to Brisbane and Melbourne in 2015.

Courses 
Jansen Newman Institute offers vocational and undergraduate qualifications in Applied Social Science specialising in Counselling or Community services, as well as postgraduate qualifications including a Master of Counselling and Applied Psychotherapy with two nested graduate qualifications.

The Practice Wellbeing Centre
As part of their coursework, students are required to practice in the college's on-campus wellbeing clinic on paying public customers.

External links
 Jansen Newman Institute website

References

Education in New South Wales
1978 establishments in Australia